Belle Lake is a lake in McLeod County and Meeker County, in the U.S. state of Minnesota. The southern two-fifths of the lake is in Acoma Township, McLeod County, and the northern three-fifths is in Meeker County.

See also
List of lakes in Minnesota

References

Lakes of McLeod County, Minnesota
Lakes of Meeker County, Minnesota